MEO Rip Curl Pro Portugal formerly known as MEO Pro Portugal, Moche Rip Curl Pro Portugal or Rip Curl Pro Portugal is a professional surfing competition of the WSL World Tour. As of 2022, held every year in March at the Supertubos beach in Peniche, Portugal. The event was first founded in 2010 as Rip Curl Pro Portugal. 

The defending men's champion is the Californian surfer Griffin Colapinto who won the event in 2022 after the break due to the COVID-19 outbreak. Before, Brazilian surfer Italo Ferreira won the event both in 2018 and 2019, being the first back-to-back winner ever on the event.

The defending women's champion is the Brasilian goofy-footed surfer Tatiana Weston-Webb, who beat American runner-up Lakey Peterson in 2022.

In 2016, due to the lack of surfing conditions on Supertubos beach, the WSL organization explored other possibilities in the peninsula and moved temporarily to Point Fabril, between Almagreira and Pico da Mota, where the waves were big and curly providing a good show for the spectators. The Round 5 of the event was done there, then the conditions on Supertubos came back, and the competition returned to its normality.

In August 2018, it was announced by the WSL that Peniche will receive once again the women's competition after nine years without it, which they lost to Cascais. Peniche will host both the men's and women's competition.

Naming 

Since the birth of this competition it had four different titles due to sponsor deals.

Winners 
The MEO Rip Curl Pro Portugal event gives birth to a new champion each and every year. The past champions of the listed WSL competition are located below.

See also 

 World Surf League
Supertubos

References

External links 
 MEO Rip Curl Pro Portugal

 
World Surf League
Surfing competitions in Portugal
Surfing in Portugal
Recurring sporting events established in 2009